Zone 414 is a 2021 American science fiction neo-noir thriller film directed by Andrew Baird in his feature-film debut, and written by Bryan Edward Hill. It stars Guy Pearce, Matilda Lutz, Jonathan Aris and Travis Fimmel. The film is about a wealthy robot designer who hires a private investigator to find his adult daughter, who goes missing inside a walled city where humans can hire humanoid robots for sexual pleasure.

It was released in the United States on September 3, 2021 by Saban Films.

Synopsis
Zone 414 is a walled city of state-of-the-art humanoid robots which cater to wealthy clients, providing companionship and sex. When the genius inventor who created the robots and whose corporation runs Zone 414 realizes that his adult daughter Melissa has gone missing inside Zone 414, he hires private investigator David Carmichael to bring her home. David is a former police detective who was forced to retire after he caused the death of his police partner and a criminal during a hostage-taking. He is still troubled by his wife's suicide, and his refusal of alcoholic drinks suggests he may be trying to stop drinking.

The Veidt Corporation tests David by asking him to shoot a woman who pleads for her life. He deduces that she must be a lifelike android and shoots her, passing the test. Psychologist Joseph Veidt then interviews David to see if he is suitable for the job, which requires discretion and willingness to work outside of the law. When he passes both tests, he meets Veidt's inventor brother Marlon, who tells him that his adult daughter Melissa has gone missing inside Zone 414. He wants David to find her without involving the police, fearing that news of a missing person in Zone 414 might lead to a crackdown on the zone's regulatory exemptions.

David pairs up with Jane, a highly advanced and self-aware robot, to find Melissa. Jane has developed human-like emotions that transcend the simulated emotions required in her work as a prostitute. She tells David that a man is leaving threatening messages for her and that she has become afraid for her safety.

David meets Royale, the pimp who helps wealthy clients select a robot to cater to their sexual needs. He asks her if some wealthy clients are paying to be able to threaten robots like Jane, but Royale denies that she would comply with such a request. He asks her about Melissa, and she says that she was hanging out at a gritty part of the city, pretending to be a robot.

As Jane continues to face threats from her stalker, the pair discover Melissa hanging by a noose in an empty warehouse in a boatyard. David returns the body to Marlon and suggests that the authorities be alerted to Zone 414's dangers. When David meets Joseph Veidt to receive his payment, David goads the psychologist into admitting that he was stalking Jane. He tells David that when Melissa caught him torturing and killing androids, he killed her. Soon after, Joseph arrives at Jane's apartment and attempts to immobilize her with a handheld device. Jane is momentarily frozen, but regains mobility and overpowers Joseph. When David returns to see Jane, he offers his gun to Jane and she shoots Joseph dead.

Marlon Veidt is seen making adjustments to an android that looks exactly like Melissa (so she may have been a lifelike android all along, or Veidt may be replacing the dead human daughter with an android). The Veidt Corporation gets David to record a statement claiming that Zone 414 is safe, and threaten him with legal action if he criticizes the android city. As part of the deal for David to keep silent, Marlon lets Jane leave the Zone and in the final scene David meets her outside the Zone gates with what looks like papers which would allow her to live in the outside world.

Cast

Holly Demaine and Jorin Cooke also briefly appear as Melissa Veidt and Hamilton, respectively.

Production
On August 28, 2019, it was announced that Travis Fimmel would play the lead role. On January 21, 2020, Guy Pearce and Matilda Lutz joined the cast, with Pearce replacing Fimmel, who took a supporting role instead.

Principal photography took place between February 6 and February 29, 2020 in Northern Ireland.

Release
The film was released in US theaters and on VOD on September 3, 2021 by Saban Films.  Netflix began streaming it on January 1, 2022.

Reception
 

Cath Clarke from The Guardian gave it two out of five stars and called it a "hollow Blade Runner copycat" in which the script  is "completely devoid of ideas about what the future of AI might look like." Todd Gilchrist from What to Watch says that while "Director Andrew Baird deserves credit for nakedly aping one of sci-fi's most famous films,... he can't recreate its style or storytelling". Gilchrist states that the "'malfunctioning' android Jane" character (Matilda Lutz) has "lackluster dialogue", and noted that her character had "some interesting dimensions the movie needed to explore better". He criticized  screenwriter Bryan Edward Hill for "front-load[ing] the film with too many ideas and references that its director, and its budget, cannot deliver [on]."

References

External links
 
 

2021 films
American independent films
American science fiction thriller films
American dystopian films
Films set in the future
Saban Films films
2021 directorial debut films
2021 science fiction films
2021 thriller films
2020s science fiction thriller films
2020s dystopian films
Android (robot) films
Films about artificial intelligence
2020s English-language films
2020s American films